Ischemic monomelic neuropathy is a rare, immediate, limb-threatening complication of hemodialysis access surgery.

Symptoms are acute hand pain and forearm muscle weakness. The major risk factors are the presence of diabetes mellitus, and the creation of a brachial artery-to-cephalic vein fistula as the vascular access. The treatment is prompt sacrifice of the access by surgical ligation.

References

Circulatory system
Surgery